The Natal Native Pioneer Corps, commonly referred to as the Natal Pioneers, was a British unit of the Zulu War. Raised in November/December 1878 the unit served throughout the war of 1879 to provide engineering support to the British invasion of Zululand. Three companies were formed each comprising around 100 men and clad in old British Army uniforms. The units served at the battles of Isandlwana, Eshowe and Ulundi.

Background 
The British High Commissioner for Southern Africa Sir Henry Bartle Frere had been attempting to form a confederation of British possessions in Southern Africa. As part of this ambition the annexation of Zululand was planned, this led to the Anglo-Zulu War of 1879. As part of preparations for this war the British military commander Frederic Thesiger (later and more commonly known as Lord Chelmsford) began gathering forces in the Colony of Natal for an invasion of Zululand. Chelmsford's plan called for an invasion by five columns of troops, though manpower shortages required him to reduce this to three. The Right Column (formerly No. 1 Column) under Charles Pearson advanced on the eastern coast, the Left Column (formerly No. 4 Column) under Evelyn Wood was to launch a feint on the west flank and Chelmsford's Centre Column (comprising the former Nos. 2 & 3 Columns) struck for the Zulu capital at Ulundi. The former No. 5 Column under Hugh Rowlands was assigned to defend the border of Transvaal with the Zulu kingdom.

The columns would need to march along existing tracks in Zululand and all supplies would need to follow them by wagon. These tracks were ill-formed and only used occasionally by traders. They turned to quagmires in the rain and were occasionally broken by steep sided dongas (dry river beds). River fords (locally known as drifts) were impassable in high water and quickly ruined when trafficked heavily. Engineering teams would be necessary to maintain the tracks and drifts to allow the columns to pass through and supplies to reach the troops.

Formation 
Chelmsford, guided by the commander of No. 2 Column Anthony Durnford - a seasoned South African campaigner, raised a force of pioneers from the black subjects of Natal. This was a development of the Natal government's isiBhalo levy system by which for years men had been pressed into duty to carry out road repairs. Durnford took the best men from the Natal Native Contingent (NNC), which had been raised as an auxiliary fighting force, to form the Natal Pioneers.

Three companies were raised, with a nominal strength of 5 white officers, 4 black officers and 96 men (though only No. 2 Company reached this strength). It had originally been intended that each company would be commanded by a regular British Army officer of the Royal Engineers, but there were too few to spare, and Durnford had to turn to the Natal government to supply suitable men. The Natal Colony also supplied the equipment for the troops: each man was provided with a pickaxe, shovel or crowbar and the non-commissioned officers were issued with a rifle. The men were issued uniforms of cast-off pre-1872 British Army issue red frock jackets; these were the traditional red coats but with the cuff facings and collar removed (these were coloured to identify individual British Army regiments). The Natal Pioneers were also issued knee-length white canvas trousers, a blue pillbox hand with a yellow band and a British Army greatcoat. Durnford had intended that the entire NNC would be similarly uniformed but a lack of supply left them to make do with only a red rag tied around the head as an identifying badge.

The Natal Pioneers were raised in November and December 1878. They served throughout the war of the following year and were disbanded in October 1879, after the Zulu capitulation.

No. 1 Company 

No. 1 Company was commanded by Lieutenant J Nolan and numbered 80 men. The unit was assigned to Chelmsford's Centre Column for the invasion and were put to use almost immediately after the initial crossing of the Buffalo River into Zululand at Rorke's Drift on 11 January. The marshy ground around the Bashee River proved impassable to Chelmsford's wagon train and Nolan's Pioneers were called into action to construct a corduroy road.

At the camp at Isandlwana the company occupied a position adjacent to the road that ran through the southern portion of the British position. They were intended to provide protection to the road and at night mounted a special guard detail over it. Chelmsford left the camp with around half his troops on the morning of 22 January 1879 to conduct a recognisance in force around the Mangeni Falls, where elements of the Zulu army had been spotted. Nolan and the majority of No. 1 Company joined this force to help clear the road for the artillery and assist in the crossing of several dongas on the route. A small detail of one officer and ten men was left behind at the camp where it was caught up in the disastrous British defeat at the Battle of Isandlwana later the same day.

The remainder of Nolan's company returned from the Mangeni and later served with Wood's Left Column. During the second invasion of Zululand later in the year it was assigned to Wood's Flying Column. Nolan, who had by then been promoted to captain, and his company fought in the British victory at the Battle of Ulundi on 4 July, the final pitched battle of the war. His forces by then amounted to 4 officers and 46 men, together with 4 horses. The company, was positioned in the centre of the British square at Ulundi and suffered no losses bar Lieutenants Hickley and Andrews who were wounded in action.

No. 2 Company 

No. 2 Company was commanded by Captain Beddoes and comprised 104 men, being the only company of the Natal Pioneers to ever reach full strength.  The company was assigned to Pearson's Right Column and worked in the vanguard, preparing the road ahead of the column's advance. On 20 January 1879 the company, together with two companies of The Buffs, worked to create a crossing of the Amatakulu River. During this time Lieutenant Main commanded the unit and was mentioned in dispatches to the British House of Commons for the role he played in repairing the tracks ahead of the column.

Half of the company was besieged at the mission station of Eshowe from January to April 1879. The men distinguished themselves in the battle, carrying out scouting work as well as their regular engineering duties. The pioneers were renowned for venturing out of the settlement to gather mealie (maize) and pumpkins which they sold to the other defenders; despite being fired upon repeatedly by the besieging Zulu none of the pioneers were killed.

No. 3 Company 
No. 3 Company under Captain Allen consisted of 80 men and served with Durnford's Column. It may have been wiped out alongside the rest of Durnford's command at Isandlwana.

References 

Military units and formations established in 1878
Military units and formations disestablished in 1879
Colony of Natal
British colonial regiments
Anglo-Zulu War